Ekko Park are a rock band from Auckland, New Zealand, that consists of guitarist and singer Joe Walsh, guitarist Jessie Booth, drummer Nick Douch and bassist Bryan Bell.

Ekko Park have released two albums: 2013's Tomorrow, Tomorrow, Today which was nominated for Best Rock Album at the 2014 New Zealand Music Awards and 2015's Know Hope which was nominated for the 2016 Taite Music Prize.  Both albums charted Top 15 in the Official New Zealand Music Chart and were in the Top 5 local releases on release week.

The singles 'Probable Cause' and 'Validation' from Know Hope were released to radio in Europe in 2016 and caused a massive stir in Italy with 'Probable Cause' going to #1 & 'Validation' going to #3 on the Official Italian Rock Radio Airplay Chart. July 2017 saw the band release a brand new single and video called "Going Uptown"

The band have played sold-out tours of NZ, headlined tours of the UK, Ireland & Italy, supported major international touring acts including Seether, The Living End and Simple Plan as well as playing major New Zealand festivals including Rhythm & Vines and Homegrown.

The band released their third album 'Horizon' on August 21, 2020. The first single from the album 'All Eyes On Me' features guest vocalist Grant Nicholas of Welsh indie rock giants Feeder.

The band were nominated for Best Rock Artist at the 2021 Aotearoa Music Awards.

Discography

Singles

Albums

References

External links 
 

New Zealand rock music groups